The Copa Paulista de Futebol, formerly known as Copa FPF, also sometimes called Copa Federação Paulista de Futebol or, in English, São Paulo State Cup, is a tournament organized by Federação Paulista de Futebol Company every second half of the season. It is played by São Paulo state teams not playing in the Campeonato Brasileiro Serie A and by reserve teams of Paulista teams playing in the Brazilian League.

The competition has already had several different names. In 2001, it was named Copa Coca-Cola (Coca-Cola Cup), due to the company's sponsorship. In 2002, it was named Copa Futebol Interior (São Paulo Countryside Football Cup). In 2003 it was named Copa Estado de São Paulo (São Paulo State Cup). From 2004 to 2007 it was named Copa FPF. Since 2008 it is named Copa Paulista de Futebol.

Since 2005, the competition winner gained the right to compete in the following year's Copa do Brasil. From 2007 to 2010, the Copa Paulista winner also competed in Recopa Sul-Brasileira.

List of Champions

There are all the championship editions, officially recognized by Federação Paulista de Futebol.

Titles by club 

Names change
 During a partnership with the food brand Etti, Paulista FC played in some championships under the name "Etti Jundiaí".

Cities change
 Oeste FC has moved from Itápolis to Barueri.

References

External links
  List of champions at the Official website

 
1999 establishments in Brazil
Recurring sporting events established in 1999